Richard Olson may refer to:

 Richard G. Olson (born 1959), American diplomat
 Richard Olson (politician) (1929–2014), mayor of Des Moines, Iowa
 Richard Olson (racing driver), Swedish-German racing driver

See also
 Rick Olson (disambiguation)